Moraea aristata is a species of flowering plant in the family Iridaceae. It is referred to by the common names blue-eyed uintjie or Blouooguintjie in Afrikaans and is a critically endangered species of plant in the genus Moraea, that is endemic to the city of Cape Town and is now restricted to the grounds of the Observatory in the Cape Town suburb of Observatory.

Moraea aristata is a winter-flowering bulb (geophyte) that produces large and striking flowers. The petals are white, but each has a large spot of iridescent blue at its base.

This plant naturally only occurs in Peninsula Shale Renosterveld vegetation in northern Cape Town. Due to the growth of the city, its habitat now mostly lies under urban sprawl. Consequently, it is critically endangered. Until recently, it only naturally survived in the grounds of the South African Astronomical Observatory in the suburb of Observatory near the foot of Devil's Peak. This tiny, isolated population is too small to be sustainable in the long term. In the wild, its natural pollinators are the Monkey beetles but these are also on the decline in the city of Cape Town. In 2017 and 2018 it was reintroduced to the Rondebosch Common, providing new hope for its survival in the wild.

In spite of its extraordinary rarity in the wild, it is easy to cultivate in sunny gardens with sandy or clay soils.

References

Further reading
 Goldblatt: The Moraeas of Southern Africa. Annals of Kirstenbosch Botanic Gardent Vol.14 CTP Book Printers Cape 1986. 

aristata
Endemic flora of South Africa
Flora of the Cape Provinces
Renosterveld
Plants described in 1826
Taxa named by Paul Friedrich August Ascherson
Taxa named by Paul Graebner